Qüxü or Chushur or Chusul or Chushul is a town and township and capital of   Qüxü County in the Lhasa Prefecture of the Tibet Autonomous Region of China. It lies on a river which soon joins the Yarlung Tsangpo river. The town has a notable prison, and as of 2009 incarcerated people such as Dolma Kyab. Lhasa Gonggar Airport lies to the southeast of the town.

See also
List of towns and villages in Tibet

External links
Wikimapia

Populated places in Lhasa (prefecture-level city)
Township-level divisions of Tibet
Qüxü County